Milan Pavlović may refer to:

 Milan Pavlović (footballer) (born 1967), Serbian footballer
 Milan Pavlović (actor) (born 1970), Bosnian actor and TV personality

See also
 Milan Pavlovič (born 1980), Slovak football